is a Japanese photojournalist.

Ōishi was born in Suginami-ku, Tokyo on 28 May 1944. Seeing Melanesian art while at Nihon University had a big effect on her, as did a visit to Vietnam and Cambodia in 1966. After graduating in photography, she became a freelance photojournalist, working in west Africa, southeast Asia, and Europe. In 1971 she held an exhibition in the Nikon Salon of photographs of a Ghanaian child growing up in Nagano; she then spent three years photographing New Guinea. She worked on portraiture, and documented the effects of the Khmer Rouge in Cambodia, the effects of wartime dioxin in Vietnam, perestroika in the Soviet Union, and more.

Ōishi's work on Vietnam won her the Domon Ken Award. In both 1982 and 1989 she won the Annual Award from the Photographic Society of Japan. She has taught at Tokyo Polytechnic University. Her work is in the permanent collection of the Tokyo Metropolitan Museum of Photography.

Books by Ōishi
Itoshi no Nyūginia. Tokyo: Gakushū-kenkyūsha, 1978.  On New Guinea.
Hana modashi: Ōishi Yoshino shashinshū. Tokyo: Buronzu-sha, 1979. 
Onna no kuni ni natta Kanbojia. Tokyo: Ushio Shuppansha, 1980.  On Cambodia.
Mukoku no tami: Kanbojia no shōgen. Tokyo: Iwanami Shoten, 1981.  On Cambodia.
Papua-jin: Ima seki-jidai ni ikiru. Tokyo: Heibonsha, 1981.  On Papua.
Wani no tami: Meraneshia geijutsu no hitobito. Tokyo: Tōjusha, 1983.  On Melanesia.
Shōnen Papanī. Tokyo: Yayoi Shobō, 1983.  On a Ghanaian child in Nagano.
Oki no kuni. Tokyo: Kumon Shuppan, 1984. .  On the Oki islands.
Shōgen suru tami: Jūnen ato no Betonamu sensō. Tokyo: Kodansha, 1984. .  On Vietnam.
Okinawa ni ikiru. Tokyo: Yōbisha, 1986.  On Okinawa.
Okinawa no genzō: Uchi to soto no sōkoku. Naha: Nirai-sha, 1988. . With Masanori Nakahodo.  On Okinawa.
"Yoru to kiri" o koete: Pōrando kyōsei shūyōjo no seikansha-tachi. Tokyo: NHK, 1988. .  On the survivors of German Nazi concentration camps in occupied Poland during World War II.
Yoru to kiri wa ima / Those Who Survived the Concentration Camps. Tokyo: Yōbisha, 1988. . 
Sobieto henreki: Ōishi Yoshino shashinshū. Tokyo: NHK, 1991. .  On the Soviet Union.
Kanashimi no Sobieto: Minzoku o aruku. Tokyo: Kodansha, 1991. .  On the Soviet Union.
Ano hi, Betonamu ni kare-hazai ga futta: Sensō no kizu-ato o mitsumetsuzuketa shinjitsu no kioku. Tokyo: Kumon Shuppan, 1992. .  On Vietnam.
Okinawa: Datsuwa no jidai. Naha: Nirai-sha, 1992. .  On Okinawa. Text by Takeshi Miki.
. Tokyo: Kodansha, 1993. . 
Kamera o kata ni mita sekai. Messēji 21. Tokyo: Rōdō-junpō-sha, 1993. . 
Hiroshima hanseki no shōzō: Yasuragi o motomeru hibi. Tokyo: Kadokawa Shoten, 1995. .  On Hiroshima.
Chiisa na kusa ni. Tokyo: Asahi Shinbunsha, 1997. . 
Kakki afurete nagai sensō no ato: Betonamu. Ajia no kodomo-tachi. Tokyo: Sōdo Bunka, 1997. .  On Vietnamese children.
Okinawa wakanatsu no kioku. Tokyo: Iwanami Shoten, 1997. .  On Okinawa.
Inochi no ki: Ajia no hitobito to shizen. Tokyo: Sōdo Bunka, 1998. . 
Betonamu rin to: Ōishi Yoshino shashinshū / Vietnam after the War. Tokyo: Kodansha, 2000. . 
Kosobo hakai no hate ni: Ōishi Yoshino shashinshū / Ethnic Cleansing in Kosovo. Tokyo: Kodansha, 2002. . 
Afuganisutan senka o ikinuku: Ōishi Yoshino shashinshū / Afghanistan: Life under Fire and the Sword. Tokyo: Fujiwara Shoten, 2003. . 
Kosobo zetsubō no fuchi kara asu e. Tokyo: Iwanami Shoten, 2004. .  On Kosovo.
Kodomo ikusayo no naka de: Ōishi Yoshino shashinshū. Tokyo: Fujiwara Shoten, 2005. .  On children.
Tamashii to no deai: Shashinka to shakaigakusha no taiwa. Tokyo: Fujiwara Shoten, 2007. .  Conversations with the sociologist Kazuko Tsurumi.
Kurokawa-nō no sato: Shōnai ni idakarete. Tokyo: Seiryū Shuppan, 2008. .  With text by Akiko Baba. On the Kurokawa nō theatre of Tsuruoka (Yamagata).
"Fu-hatsudan" to ikiru: Inori o oru Raosu. Tokyo: Fujiwara Shoten, 2008. .  On Laos.
Shimura no iro: Shimura Fukumi, Shimura Yōko no senshoku / Colors of the Shimuras. Tokyo: Kyūryūdō, 2009. .  On the kimono of Fukumi Shimura and Yōko Shimura, and with text by them.
Sore demo emi o. Tokyo: Seiryū, 2011. .
Fukushima Fukushima: Tsuchi to ikiru: Ōishi Yoshino shashinshū. Tokyo: Fujiwara Shoten, 2013. .  On Fukushima Prefecture after the tsunami.

Notes

External links
Dreaming of a Return Home to Sudan. JICA. Photographs by Ōishi of Sudan.

Japanese photojournalists
1944 births
Living people
People from Suginami
Photography in Afghanistan
Photography in Cambodia
Photography in the Soviet Union
Photography in Vietnam
Date of birth missing (living people)
Nihon University alumni
Japanese women photographers
Recipients of the Medal with Purple Ribbon
Women photojournalists